The 1982 Hong Kong local elections, commonly known as 1982 Hong Kong District Board elections, were the first ever local elections under the new creation of 18 district boards.

Under the governorship of Murray MacLehose, the Hong Kong Government published a Green Paper proposal entitled A Pattern of District Administration in Hong Kong in June 1980. It involved the setting up of 18 district boards to be partially directly elected on the universal franchise and partially appointed.

Among a total of 490 members in the 18 District Boards, 132 (around one-third) were directly elected by the general public. A further 134 members were appointed, and the rest were ex officio. The election for the district boards in New Territories was held on 4 March 1982 while the district boards in the urban areas was held on 23 September in the same year.

List of District Boards

General outcome

References

 
Hong Kong
1982 in Hong Kong
1982
1982 elections in the British Empire
March 1982 events in Asia
September 1982 events in Asia